Euxesta anomalipennis is a species of ulidiid or picture-winged fly in the genus Euxesta of the family Ulidiidae.

References

anomalipennis
Insects described in 1933